"Heartbeat in the Darkness" is a song written by Dave Loggins and Russell Smith, and recorded by American country music artist Don Williams.  It was released in May 1986 as the second single from the album New Moves.  The song was Williams' 17th and final number one on the country chart.  The single spent one week at number one and spent a total of 13 weeks on the chart.

Chart performance

References

1986 singles
1986 songs
Don Williams songs
Songs written by Dave Loggins
Songs written by Russell Smith (singer)
Song recordings produced by Garth Fundis
Capitol Records singles